The North Carolina A&T Aggies men's basketball team represents North Carolina A&T State University in Greensboro, North Carolina, United States. The team currently competes in the Colonial Athletic Association. They are currently led by first-year head coach Phillip Shumpert. They play their home games at the Corbett Sports Center.

Postseason results

NCAA Division I Tournament results
The Aggies have appeared in ten NCAA Division I Tournaments. Their combined record is 1–10. The 2013 team made history when the Aggies won their first Division I post-season game (either NCAA or NIT), defeating Liberty.

NCAA Division II Tournament results
The Aggies have appeared in four NCAA Division II Tournaments. Their combined record is 10–4.

NIT results
The Aggies have appeared in the National Invitation Tournament (NIT) two times. Their record combined is 0–2.

CIT results
The Aggies have appeared in the CollegeInsider.com Postseason Tournament (CIT) one time. Their record is 0–1.

References

External links
Website